Mohanpur is one of the 60 Legislative Assembly constituencies of Tripura state in India. It is in West Tripura district and a part of Tripura West (Lok Sabha constituency).

Members of Legislative Assembly 
 1967: P. R. D. Gupta, Indian National Congress
 1972: Radharaman Debnath, Communist Party of India (Marxist)
 1977: Radharaman Debnath, Communist Party of India (Marxist)
 1983: Dhirendra Chandra Debnath, Indian National Congress
 1988: Dhirendra Chandra Debnath, Indian National Congress
 1993: Ratan Lal Nath, Indian National Congress
 1998: Ratan Lal Nath, Indian National Congress
 2003: Ratan Lal Nath, Indian National Congress
 2008: Ratan Lal Nath, Indian National Congress
 2013: Ratan Lal Nath, Indian National Congress

Election results

2018

See also
List of constituencies of the Tripura Legislative Assembly
West Tripura district

References

West Tripura district
Assembly constituencies of Tripura